Calcutta Puppet Theatre is a Bengali puppet academy, theatre group, an institute of dance, drama and music. The group was formed in 1973 by Suresh Dutta.

Performances 
 Ramayan (1982)
 Aladin
 Seeta
 Ajob desh
 Kagoj
 Kaktarua
 Kalo hira
 Boka hash

References

External links 
 

Culture of Kolkata
Arts organizations established in 1973
Puppetry in India
Theatre in India
Puppet theaters